Basketball Club Dnipro, commonly known as simply Dnipro, is a Ukrainian professional basketball club that is based in Dnipro. The home court of the club is Palace of Sports Shynnik. The women's team of the club won the Ukrainian Superleague in 2010.

History
The women's team of the club has made three appearances in the FIBA Eurocup since 2007. Dnipro would reach their first championship series against BC Khimik in 2015, only to be swept by them by three games. A year later, Dnipro would win their first ever Ukrainian SuperLeague Championship, sweeping BC Budivelnyk in all three of their games against them.

The 2019–20 Superleague season was ended prematurely due to the COVID-19 pandemic. Because Dnipro was first in the standings at the time, the team won its second championship.

Honours
Ukrainian SuperLeague
 Champions (2): 2015–16, 2019–20
 Runners-up (2): 2015, 2018
 Third place (1) 2017

Ukrainian Cup
 Champions (5): 2011, 2016, 2017, 2018, 2019
 Runners-up (2): 2015, 2020

Season by season

Players

Current squad

Notable players

 Jared Terrell
 Alex Len
 Steve Burtt 
 Eugene Jeter  
 Denham Brown 
 Patrick Beverley 
 Mario Austin  
 Qyntel Woods 
 Darnell Lazare  
 Donatas Zavackas  
 Tautvydas Lydeka

References

External links
Official website 

Basketball teams in Ukraine
Basketball teams established in 2003
Sport in Dnipro
2003 establishments in Ukraine
Privat Group